Progress M-29M, identified by NASA as Progress 61P was a Progress spaceflight by Roskosmos to resupply the International Space Station (ISS) in 2015. It was launched on 1 October 2015, to deliver cargo to the ISS. Progress M-29M is the final vehicle in Progress-M series, which was succeeded by the modified variant known as Progress-MS later in 2015.

Launch
Progress M-29M was launched on 1 October 2015 at 16:49:40 UTC from the Baikonur Cosmodrome in Kazakhstan.

Docking
Progress M-29M docked with the Zvezda docking compartment on 1 October 2015 at 22:52 UTC. The spacecraft undocked from the station on 30 March 2016 at 14:14 UTC.

Cargo
The Progress M-29M spacecraft carried 2369 kg of cargo and supplies to the International Space Station. The spacecraft delivered food, fuel and supplies, including 350 kg of propellant, 50 kg of oxygen and air, 420 kg of water, and 1549 kg of spare parts, supplies and experiment hardware for the six members of the Expedition 45 crew. Progress M-29M is scheduled to remain docked to Zvezda for about two months.

See also

 2015 in spaceflight

References

External links

Progress (spacecraft) missions
Spacecraft launched in 2015
2015 in Russia
Spacecraft which reentered in 2016
Spacecraft launched by Soyuz-U rockets
Supply vehicles for the International Space Station